Christopher James Paolini (born November 17, 1983) is an American author and screenwriter. He is best known for The Inheritance Cycle, which consists of the books Eragon, Eldest, Brisingr, Inheritance, and the follow up short story collection The Fork, the Witch and the Worm. His first science fiction novel, To Sleep in a Sea of Stars, was published on September 15, 2020. He lives in Paradise Valley, Montana, where he wrote his first book.

Early life
Paolini was born in Los Angeles, California, and raised in the area of Paradise Valley, Montana. His family members include his parents, Kenneth Paolini and Talita Hodgkinson, and his younger sister, Angela Paolini. Home schooled for the duration of his education, Paolini graduated from high school at the age of 15 through a set of accredited correspondence courses from the American School of Correspondence in Lansing, Illinois.

Career
He started his work on his first novel, Eragon, at the age of 15. This novel would become the first of a four-book series set in the mythical land of Alagaësia. 

In 2002, Eragon was published for the first time by Paolini International LLC, Paolini's parents' publishing company. To promote the book, Paolini toured over 135 schools and libraries, discussing reading and writing, all the while dressed in "a medieval costume of red shirt, billowy black pants, lace-up boots, and a jaunty black cap." He drew the cover art for the first edition of Eragon, which featured Saphira's eye, along with the maps on the inside covers of his books.

In mid-2002, the stepson of author Carl Hiaasen found Eragon in a bookstore and loved it; this led to Hiaasen bringing it to the attention of his publisher, Alfred A. Knopf. Knopf subsequently made an offer to publish Eragon and the rest of The Inheritance Cycle. The second edition of Eragon was published by Knopf in August 2003. At the age of nineteen, Paolini became a New York Times-bestselling author.

In December 2006, Fox 2000 released the film adaptation of Eragon in theaters around the world. It received mostly negative reviews from critics, and made a combined domestic and international gross of $249,488,115 USD against a production budget of $100,000,000.	

Eldest, the sequel to Eragon, was released August 23, 2005. The third book in the cycle, Brisingr, was released on September 20, 2008. Although The Inheritance Cycle was originally planned as a trilogy, a fourth book, Inheritance, was released on November 8, 2011 in the US, Australia, New Zealand, the EU, and India, and was subsequently translated and published in fifty-three countries. The Inheritance Cycle has sold more than 41 million copies.

On December 31, 2018, The Fork, the Witch, and the Worm, the first book in a series called Tales of Alagaësia, was published and released to the public.

Paolini's new science fiction novel, To Sleep in a Sea of Stars, was released on September 15, 2020, by Tor Books. He also plans to return to the world of Alagaësia with a fifth book when he finishes his science-fiction book.

In October of 2021, Christopher released Unity, an interactive Fractalverse story on his science fiction website Fractalverse.net.

On October 8, 2022 it was announced that To Sleep in a Sea of Stars has been optioned by Made Up Stories and Snoot Entertainment.

On July 25, 2022, Variety reported that Paolini was co-writing a live action television series adaptation of Eragon for Disney+, with Bert Salke executive producing.

On October 3, 2022, Paolini announced Fractal Noise, the third installment in the Fractalverse and a prequel to To Sleep in a Sea of Stars. It will be published on May 16, 2023.

Influences
Paolini's literary inspirations include the works of J. R. R. Tolkien and E. R. Eddison, as well as the epic poem Beowulf. Paolini has said that Eragon was "specifically inspired" by Jeremy Thatcher, Dragon Hatcher, by Bruce Coville. Other literary influences include David Eddings, Andre Norton, Brian Jacques, Anne McCaffrey, Raymond E. Feist, Mervyn Peake, Ursula K. Le Guin and Frank Herbert. Other favorite books include works by Jane Yolen, Philip Pullman, and Garth Nix.

Nature influences much of Paolini's writing. In an interview with Philip Pullman and Tamora Pierce, Paolini said that Paradise Valley, Montana is "one of the main sources" of his inspiration.

In the acknowledgments of Brisingr, Paolini acknowledged the influence of Leon and Hiroko Kapp's The Craft of the Japanese Sword for his description of the forging of Eragon's sword. Additionally, Paolini has admitted that he is a Doctor Who fan, which inspired his reference to the "lonely god" (the epithet given to the Doctor by the Face of Boe in the episode "New Earth"), to "rooms that are bigger on the inside than the outside" (from "Questions Unanswered" in Inheritance), as well as to Raxacoricofallapatorius, the home of the Slitheen ("Blood Price" in Inheritance).

Reception
Paolini's books have sold very well and have topped the charts of The New York Times, USA Today, and Publishers Weekly bestsellers lists.

The Guinness World Records recognized Christopher Paolini as the "youngest author of a bestselling book series" on January 5, 2011.

Bibliography

The Inheritance Cycle

Main series
Eragon (2002)
Eldest (2005)
Brisingr (2008)
Inheritance (2011)
Tales from Alagaësia: The Fork, the Witch, and the Worm (2018)
Murtagh (2023)

Companion books
Eragon's Guide to Alagaësia (2009)
 The Official Eragon Coloring Book - with Ciruelo Cabral (2017)

Fractalverse
To Sleep in a Sea of Stars (2020)
Unity (2021)
Fractal Noise (2023)

Notes

External links

 Paolini.net Paolini family official website

1983 births
Living people
21st-century American novelists
American children's writers
American fantasy writers
American writers of Italian descent
People from Park County, Montana
Writers from Los Angeles
Writers from Montana
American writers of young adult literature
American male novelists
21st-century American male writers